Hisayo (written: 久代, 久世) is a feminine Japanese given name. Notable people with the name include:

 (born 1960), Japanese high jumper
 (born 1978), Japanese voice actress
Rowan Hisayo Buchanan, American-British writer
 (born 1962), Japanese sport shooter
, Japanese electrical engineer

See also
5354 Hisayo, main-belt asteroid

Japanese feminine given names